Bombrini-Parodi-Delfino (better known as BPD), was a chemical company founded in 1912 by Giovanni Bombrini and Leopoldo Parodi-Delfino to produce gunpowder and explosives. Around its location in Colleferro (south of Rome) soon grew a small town attracting manpower from the nearby farms. After World War I, BPD expanded its activities on fertilizers and cement at nearby Segni (Società Calce e Cementi). In 1938 an explosion in the gunpowder plant killed 60 people. After World War II, BPD diversified into metalworking, textiles and chemistry. The last remaining owner, the Parodi-Delfino family, entered a joint venture with SNIA-Viscosa in 1968. SNIA's chemical division was thereafter named SNIA BPD until BPD was sold to Simmel Difesa, when it was renamed SNIA SpA.

BPD contribution to missile research

BPD played an important role in developing missile solid fuels. In 1952, on behalf of the Aeronautica Militare, BPD patented a solid fuel based on nitro-glycerine and cellulose nitrate, the first step in developing experimental missiles on an industrial scale. The Aeronautica_Militare also contracted BPD to develop a meteorological missile, called the 160-70, employing two propulsion systems. The 160-70 was successfully employed in many launches between 1961 and 1963. In 1961 state and private companies merged; publicly owned Finmeccanica and the private firms BPD and FIAT were incorporated into the Società Generale Missilistica Italiana.

SNIA-BPD also developed a series of air-to-surface rockets in the 1980s as part of the Medusa rocket system.  The rockets were of 51-mm, 81-mm, and 122-mm caliber.

References

External links
View inside a BPD factory.
BPD worker.
BPD-produced 20-mm round of ammunition.

Bibliography
AA.VV:, Le attività spaziali italiane dal dopoguerra all’istituzione dell’Agenzia Spaziale Italiana, Agenzia Spaziale Europea

Aerospace companies of Italy
Defence companies of Italy
Chemical companies of Italy
Italian brands
Chemical companies established in 1912
Italian companies established in 1912
Manufacturing companies disestablished in 1968
1968 disestablishments in Italy
1968 mergers and acquisitions